Agar Malwa District is a district in the state of Madhya Pradesh in India. It was carved out of Shajapur district. Its administrative headquarters are situated in the town of Agar.

History
It was a division during the Sindhia state (some of their palaces are still presently used for city court and for other government offices). It was formerly a cantonment region at the time of India's independence because of the favourable weather and the availability of water. It was a district under the state of Madhya Bharat after the independence of India until 1956. Since 16 August 2013 Agar Malwa has been the 51st district of Madhya Pradesh. The district was formed by removing Agar, Badod, Susner and Nalkheda tehsils from Shajapur District, decreasing its size. It was formerly a cantonment region at the time of India's independence because of the favourable weather and the availability of water. It was a district under the state of Madhya Bharat after the independence of India until 1956. Since 16 August 2013 Agar Malwa has been the 51st district of Madhya Pradesh.

Geography
The western part of the district is marked by the Agar Plateau that covers the major areas of Agar Malwa district. There is a hill tract to the west of the town of Badod, showing scattered hillocks in a north–south direction. The presence of hills in the center has affected the drainage pattern.

Dudhaliya and Kachhol are the main streams in the west, originating from the hill tract and draining towards the west. Chhoti Kali Sindh, which is the main perennial stream of the region, flows northwards on the western border of the region.

Demographics 
At the time of the 2011 census, Agar Malwa district had a population of 571,278, of which 117,329 (20.54%) lived in urban areas. Agar Malwa had a sex ratio of 949 females per 1000 males. Scheduled Castes and Scheduled Tribes make up 135,898 (23.79%) and 13,941 (2.44%) of the population respectively.

90.83% of the population were Hindu, 7.58% Muslim, and 1.48% Jain.

At the time of the 2011 census, 53.24% of the population spoke Malvi, 41.31% Hindi and 4.80% Sondwari as their first language.

Government and politics

Administrative divisions
Agar Malwa District has two sub-divisions, Agar Malwa division and Susner Division. There are four tehsils: Agar Malwa, Badod, Susner and Nalkheda.

Banking facilities
The list of banks functioning in Agar Malwa:
AU Small Finance Bank, Agar Malwa Branch
Bank of Baroda, Agar Malwa, Madhya Pradesh Branch 
Bank of India, Agar Malwa Branch
Bank of India, Collectorate, Agar Malwa Branch
DCB Bank Limited, Pal Branch
IDFC First Bank Ltd, Agar Malwa Branch
Indian Bank, Agar Malwa Branch
Indian Bank, Dongargaon Branch
Union Bank of India, Agar Malwa Branch

References

 
States and territories established in 2013
Districts of Madhya Pradesh
2013 establishments in Madhya Pradesh